Angkor: Heart of an Asian Empire is a 1989 illustrated monograph on the archaeology and rediscovery of Angkor Wat. Written by the French archaeologist and art historian, Bruno Dagens, and published in pocket format by Éditions Gallimard as the  volume in their "Découvertes" collection (known as "Abrams Discoveries" in the United States, and "New Horizons" in the United Kingdom). The book was adapted into a documentary film with the same title in 2002.

Introduction 

As part of the  series in the "Découvertes Gallimard" collection,  covers the rediscovery of Angkor Wat and the study of archaeological sites, objects, and documents found in the site, but not its history.

According to the tradition of "Découvertes", which is based on abundant pictorial documentation and a way of bringing together visual documents and texts, enhanced by printing on coated paper, as commented in L'Express, "genuine monographs, published like art books.

Here the author chronologically traces the whole history of the rediscovery of Angkor Wat—once the capital of the Khmer Empire—by people from all over the world, mainly European discoveries and explorations, for instance, Henri Mouhot, Doudart de Lagrée, Louis Delaporte, Francis Garnier, Henri Marchal, among others.

Contents 

The book opens with a "trailer", that is, a series of full-page watercolors made by the 19th-century French archaeologist and explorer . The body text is divided into six chapters:
 Chapter I: "Discovery? Is That the Word?";
 Chapter II: "The 'Discoverer'";
 Chapter III: "Exploration";
 Chapter IV: "The Last of the Explorers";
 Chapter V: "Angkor Reinstated";
 Chapter VI: "Angkor, the Glory of a Nation".

The second part of the book, the "Documents", containing a compilation of excerpts divided into five parts:
 The Journey to Angkor;
 Cosmic Symbolism;
 Chronology;
 Restoration and Anastylosis;
 Tourists in Angkor.
 Further Reading;
 List of Illustrations;
 Index.

Reception 
This book has been given an average score of 3.83 stars out of 5 on both Goodreads and Book Depository by its users. It has been given a 4.6 out of 5 stars on Amazon by its customers.

Adaptation 
In 2002, the book was adapted into an documentary film of the same name. It was broadcast on Arte as part of the television program The Human Adventure. and dubbed into German by the title . However, it is unclear whether the film is available with dubbing or subtitling.

See also 
 Khmer architecture
 Buddhism in Cambodia
 Hinduism in Cambodia
 In the "Découvertes Gallimard" collection:
 Khmer: The Lost Empire of Cambodia by Thierry Zéphir

References

External links 
  
 
 

1989 non-fiction books
Archaeology books
Non-fiction books adapted into films
Découvertes Gallimard
2002 documentary films
2002 films
French documentary television films
Documentary films about Cambodia
2000s French films